The Sandover Highway is an outback unsealed track in the Northern Territory between the Plenty Highway north of Alice Springs and the Northern Territory/Queensland border.

Description
The highway's name is derived from the Sandover River because its alignment follows that of the river.

The designated highway finishes  just east of Alpurrurulam at the Northern Territory/Queensland border, but the track continues into Queensland for  where it joins the Camooweal Urandangi Road, which runs north to Camooweal.

Accessibility
The track crosses Urapuntja lands, which is an Aboriginal homelands area. No permits are needed to travel on the track; however, they are necessary for travellers wishing to visit Aboriginal communities off-track.

Although the first part of the track can be negotiated by conventional vehicles, use of a four-wheel drive vehicle is recommended after Ammaroo. Each year the wet season floods the black soil plains at the eastern end of the Sandover Highway and Alpurrurulam and Lake Nash become completely inaccessible, even to four-wheel drive vehicles. Flooding can also occur after brief but heavy thunderstorms during the dry season.

Stations and fuel
Ammaroo Station has a shop with basic supplies. Fuel is available but there are no camping facilities. Another fuel supply along the track can be found at Arlparra.

See also

 Highways in Australia
 List of highways in the Northern Territory

References

Australian outback tracks
Highways in the Northern Territory